Lyncombe may refer to:
 A hamlet near Exford, Somerset
 The former settlement and parish, and now district of Lyncombe, Bath